Maria Hassan (born 1952) is a Swedish social democratic politician. She was a member of the Riksdag from 2002 to 2006.

Honours and awards 

  2009: Third Class of the Order of Merit of the Ukraine

References

External links
Maria Hassan at the Riksdag website

Members of the Riksdag from the Social Democrats
Living people
Recipients of the Order of Merit (Ukraine), 3rd class
1952 births
Women members of the Riksdag
Members of the Riksdag 2002–2006
21st-century Swedish women politicians